Queen Jeongsuk of the Yeongheung Choi clan was the second wife of Ikjo of Joseon, the mother of Dojo of Joseon and the grandmother of Hwanjo of Joseon, also the biological great-grandmother of Taejo of Joseon, the founder of the Joseon Dynasty.

Biography
She was the daughter of Choi Gi-Yeol, Prince Anbyeon (최기열 안변군) from the Yeongheung Choi clan (영흥 최씨, 永興 崔氏). She was the second wife of Yi Haengni (이행리) because his first wife, Lady Son (손씨) died too early. On 28 July 1392, when her great-grandson, Yi Seong-Gye (이성계) make the new dynasty , she was given royal title Jeong-bi (정비, 貞妃; literally: Queen Jeong or Consort Jeong) and her husband was given title King Ik (익왕, 翼王). Later on 22 April 1411, her great-great-grandson, Taejong of Joseon, gave her a posthumous name Jeongsuk Wanghu (정숙왕후, 貞淑王后; literally: Queen Jeongsuk). With him, she had 6 sons and 1 daughter. However, she later died on 20 September ?. Her tomb was located in Sukneung, Muncheon-gun, Hamgyeongnam-do and her husband's tomb was located in Jireung, Anbyeon-gun, Hamgyeongnam-do.

References

External links
Queen Jeongsuk on Encykorea .

13th-century Korean people
Royal consorts of the Joseon dynasty
Korean queens consort
Year of birth unknown
Year of death unknown
Goryeo people
Date of birth unknown